Fazeley Junction is the name of the canal junction where the authorised Birmingham and Fazeley Canal terminates and meets the Coventry Canal at Fazeley, near Tamworth, Staffordshire, England.

History
The Coventry Canal was authorised by an Act of Parliament in 1768, to connect Coventry to the Grand Trunk Canal, now called the Trent and Mersey Canal, at Fradley, passing through Atherstone and Fazeley. They opened the first  from Coventry to Bedworth, where there were coal mines, in 1769, and a lucrative trade in coal soon developed. By the time they reached Atherstone in 1771, the money had run out and construction stopped.

The Birmingham and Fazeley Canal faced serious opposition from the Birmingham Canal Company, but this was eventually overcome, and the route was authorised in 1784. It was designed to provide a much shorter route to London, as all goods from Birmingham to London had previously had to pass down the River Severn before crossing southern England. However, the canal would have been useless unless the Coventry Canal link north of Atherstone was completed, and so the company negotiated with several other canals to ensure that it would be part of a much bigger network once it was completed. This included the Oxford Canal, who agreed to extend their line southwards to reach Oxford and the River Thames, while completion of the Coventry Canal link to Fradley was to be completed in three stages. The Coventry Canal company would build the route to Fazeley, which included the eleven Atherstone locks and two more at Glascote.

The Birmingham and Fazeley Canal was completed in 1789, under the direction of John Smeaton and the whole network was operational in the following year. As a result of the junction and the traffic that passed through it, the Coventry Canal was profitable, and bought the section from Fradley to Whittington from the Trent and Mersey company, but the Birmingham and Fazeley, which soon became part of the Birmingham Canal Navigations, retained ownership of their section. As a result, the bridges north of Fazeley carry name plates in the BCN style, rather than numbers.

Location
The route to Fradley Junction heads north-west, and is level for the entire , but there are locks on the Trent and Mersey Canal either side of the junction. The Coventry Canal initially heads north-east before turning to the south. The first lock is at Glascote, just  from the junction.

See also

Canals of the United Kingdom
History of the British canal system

Bibliography

References

Canal junctions in England
Canals in Staffordshire
Birmingham Canal Navigations